Sciotropis cyclanthorum is a species of damselfly in the family Megapodagrionidae. It is endemic to Venezuela.  Its natural habitats are subtropical or tropical moist montane forests and rivers. It is threatened by habitat loss.

References

Endemic fauna of Venezuela
Megapodagrionidae
Odonata of South America
Insects described in 1959
Taxonomy articles created by Polbot